Menyhért Lakatos (April 11, 1926, Vésztő — August 21, 2007, Budapest) was a Hungarian Romani  writer

Since 1988 he was President of the Hungarian Romani Cultural Association (Magyarországi Cigányok Kulturális Szövetsége).

His most famous book, Füstös képek ("Images in Smoke", translated in English as The Color of Smoke) is a novel based on personal experience, set in World War II. It is a bildungsroman that shows life in a Roma village in Northeast Hungary, from 1940 until the German occupation of the country in 1944 when Roma people were put into death camps. While filled with amusing anecdotes, with a petty criminal subplot, and adolescent eroticism, it  portrays dehumanization of Romani in the society.

There is the  Lakatos Menyhért School in Budapest.

Books
1975: Füstös képek
Bulgarian: Окадени картини, 1977
German: Bitterer Rauch.  Verlag Volk und Welt. Berlin 1978, 1979, 1980, 1982
French: Couleur de fumée : une épopée tzigane, Paris, Actes Sud, 1986.
English: The Color of Smoke: An Epic Novel of the Roma, 2015, 
1975:  Angárka és Busladarfi
1979: A hét szakállas farkas
1979: A paramisák ivadékai
1981: Az öreg fazék titka
1981: Csandra szekere
German:  Csandras Karren. Zigeunergeschichten. Volk und Welt, Berlin 1984
1982: Akik élni akarta
1995: Hosszú éjszakák meséi
German: Märchen der langen Nächte. Roma-Märchen. Wieser Verlag, Klagenfurt 2004, 1999
1998: A titok
1999: Tenyérből mondtál jövendőt
Märchen der langen Nächte. Roma-Märchen. Wieser Verlag, Klagenfurt 2004

Awards
Significant awards include:
2000: National Romani Self-Government Lifetime Achievement Award
1999: 
1995: Book of the Year Award
1993: Attila József Prize
1976: Attila József Prize
1976: Milán Füst Prize

References

1926 births
2007 deaths
Hungarian writers
Romani writers
Attila József Prize recipients